This is the discography for American alternative rock band The Airborne Toxic Event.

Albums

Studio albums

Live albums

Extended plays

Singles

Guest appearances

Notes

Music videos 
"Does This Mean You're Moving On?" (2007, Directed by Jason Wishnow)
"Sometime Around Midnight" (2008, Directed by Jason Wishnow)
"Gasoline" (2008, Directed by Billy Johnson)
"Sometime Around Midnight" (2009, New Version, Directed by D.J. Caruso)
"Happiness is Overrated" (2009, Directed by Jon Danovic)
"Changing" (2011, Directed by Jon Danovic)
"Numb" (2011, Directed by Jon Danovic)
"All I Ever Wanted" (2011, Directed by Jon Danovic)
"Timeless"  (2013, Directed by Jon Danovic)
"Come on Out" (2020, Directed by Silvia Grav)

References 

Alternative rock discographies
Discographies of American artists